Kathleen Brady may be:
 Kathleen T. Brady, b. 1952, American psychiatrist
 Kathleen Brady (historian), American historian